Ummareddy Venkateswarlu (born 1 July 1935) is an Indian politician. Chief Whip in Andhra Pradesh Legislative Council  He joined YSR Congress party in November 2012. He was an MLA and senior leader in Telugu Desam Party.

Life
He is a native of Kondubhotla Palem of Bapatla Mandal in Guntur district of Andhra Pradesh. He holds a doctorate in agriculture and was educated at Andhra Pradesh Agriculture University and Banaras Hindu University.

Positions
 1985-89 - Member, Andhra Pradesh Legislative Assembly 
 1986 - Member, Select Committee to Amend the Andhra Pradesh Co-operatives Act 
 1987-89 - Member, Estimates Committee Andhra Pradesh Legislative Assembly 
 1989-91 - Secretary, Telugu Desam Party (T.D.P.), Andhra Pradesh 
 1991 - Elected to 10th Lok Sabha ( Tenali seat )
 1991-94 - Member, Consultative Committee, Ministry of Agriculture 
 1991-95 -Vice-President, T.D.P., Andhra Pradesh 
 1993-94 - Member, Committee on Papers Laid on the Table 
 1993-96 - Member, Committee on Human Resource Development 
 1994-96 - Member, Consultative Committee, Ministry of Communications 
 1995-96 - Member, Committee on Government Assurances 
 1996 - Re-elected to 11th Lok Sabha (2nd term) ( Bapatla seat )
 Member, Politburo, T.D.P. 
 President, T.D.P. (Publicity wing) 
 July 1996-98 - Union Minister of State, Agriculture 
 Union Minister of State, Urban Affairs, Employment and Parliamentary Affairs (Independent Charge) 
 1999 - Re-elected to 13th Lok Sabha (3rd term) ( Tenali seat )
 1999-2000 - Member, Committee on Energy 
 Member, Joint Committee on the Protection of Plant Varieties and Farmers' 
 Rights Bill, 1999 
 Member, General Purposes Committee 
 1999-2000 - Chairman, Committee on Estimates 2000-2001
 2015 Member of Legislative Council, Andhra Pradesh 
 2019 Opposition Floor Leader, Andhra Pradesh Legislative Council
 2021 Member of Legislative Council, Andhra Pradesh
 2022 Chief Whip for Andhra Pradesh Legislative Council.

References

Living people
1935 births
YSR Congress Party politicians
India MPs 1991–1996
India MPs 1996–1997
India MPs 1999–2004
Lok Sabha members from Andhra Pradesh
People from Guntur district
Telugu politicians
Telugu Desam Party politicians